Eve of Destruction is a two-part television miniseries directed by Robert Lieberman. The miniseries was first aired in 2013.

Plot 
When an experiment to harvest a limitless pool of "dark energy" goes awry, scientists scramble to fix their deadly mistake before more lives are lost.

Cast 
 Steven Weber : Dr. Karl Dameron
 Christina Cox : Dr. Rachel Reed 
 Treat Williams : Max Salinger
 Aleks Paunovic : Ruslan
 Colin Lawrence : David Jackson 
 Jessica McLeod : Ruby Dameron 
 Leah Gibson : Chloe Banks 
 Eli Goree : Madhatter53
 Michael P. Northey : Dominic

Reception
Radio Times said, "Favouring unnecessary padding over character and story development, the cut-down TV mini-series ends up mainly talk and no drama, as boffins Steven Weber and Christina Cox seem to bore even themselves with their dry and incessant pseudo-science,"

References

External links 

2010s American television miniseries
American science fiction films
2013 in American television